Carex hispida is a species of perennial herb in the family Cyperaceae (sedges). They have a self-supporting growth form and have simple, broad leaves.

Sources

References

hispida
Flora of Malta